An accumulated thermal unit, is a unit of measurement used to describe the cumulative effect of temperature over time. 1 ATU is equal to 1 degree Celsius for 1 day. For example, in an environment at a constant temperature of 5 °C, 5 ATU would accumulate per day, with 65 ATUs accumulated after 13 days.

Accumulated thermal units are used, for example, in aquaculture to track the development of incubating salmonid eggs. Eggs incubated at 10 °C develop twice as fast as eggs incubated at 5 °C.

Standards
Temperature